Shattered is a 2011 Kenyan film directed by Gilbert Lukalia with Nollywood actress Rita Dominic as Keziah Njema playing the lead role. It won 2 awards at the 2012 African Movie Academy Awards. Rita Dominic also won the 2012 best actress award at the Kalasha Film and Television Awards in Kenya.

Cast

Rita Dominic as Keziah Njema
Mumbi Maina      as Mumbi Miana
Robert Burale    as Frank Njema
Allan Adika      as Jomo
Naomi Wambui

References

2011 films
Nigerian drama films
Kenyan drama films
2011 drama films
2010s English-language films
English-language Nigerian films
English-language Kenyan films